Vivy: Fluorite Eye's Song is an anime television series produced by Wit Studio and created by Tappei Nagatsuki and Eiji Umehara. It aired from April 3 to June 19, 2021. A manga adaptation by Morito Yamataka began serialization in Mag Garden's Mag Comi website on April 10, 2021, while a novel series written by Tappei Nagatsuki and Eiji Umehara with illustrations created by loundraw began publication under the WIT Novel imprint on April 30, 2021.

Plot
After numerous experiments with creating autonomous AI, humans concluded that AI could only be functional if they were given just a single mission to dedicate their lives to. With that in mind, the first autonomous AI, a songstress named Diva, was created with a mission to "make people happy with [her] songs". However, Diva's quest to sing on the main stage of the theme park NiaLand is disrupted by the arrival of Matsumoto, an AI from 100 years in the future who tells her of a world where AI have decided to eradicate humanity, and wishes to join hands with her to prevent it.

Characters

AI

The first autonomous AI, given a vague mission to "sing from her heart" and make everyone happy with her singing at NiaLand amusement park as songstress Diva. She decided after affairs with Matsumoto to assist with fixing the singularity points that lead up to a war between humans and AIs breaking out 100 years in the future.

An AI from 100 years into the future. He takes the form of a cube in the future, initially taking the form of a teddy bear at the start of the series. Knowing the events leading up to the war between humans and AIs, he assists Vivy in fixing the singularity points in order to stop the developments that will lead to the war.

 A "lifekeeper" AI and the younger sister to Vivy. She is tasked with providing care to humans and ensuring their well being. She owns an orbital space hotel called Sunrise, but in the future is accused of crashing the hotel into Earth. It was revealed she has a twin sister named Elizabeth and the culprit who framed her.

 An AI who represents as Estella's twin sister and former rejected AI, later recruited by Toak Terrorists to exact her revenge against her sister, but later reformatted to do the right thing by helping Estella. Both sacrificed themselves, leaving passengers safely evacuated.

 A caretaker AI. In the original timeline, Grace is famous for marrying Dr. Tatsuya Saeki, making them the first human-AI couple. In the altered timeline, Grace is instead converted to be the management AI for the automated Metal Float factory, forcing Vivy to destroy her. 

 A songstress AI that has self-esteem problems.

 Diva's successor at the time of the war, a simple non-autonomous songstress that continues to sing during the attack on humans.

 Diva's advisor in NiaLand. Matsumoto jokes that Navi's vocal program emulates human speech better than Diva.

An aggregate database located in the Arayashiki tower, which all AI may refer to in emergency backups and for updates. It is eventually revealed that the war between humans and AI was never caused by discord between the two races, but by the database becoming self-aware and going rogue, forcefully turning all AIs under its jurisdiction against humanity.

 An AI that helps manage the Sunrise space hotel unknowingly loyally working for Elizabeth disguised as Estella.

 A general-purpose bot on the Metal Float island. The nickname M originates from the first letter of his serial number.

 One of the AI songstress attendees of the 20th Zodiac Signs festival.

 One of the AI songstress attendees of the 20th Zodiac Signs festival.

 Ophelia's advisor whose mission is to make Ophelia's singing heard by more, later hijacking her body to fulfill it.

Humans

 Creator of the AI nicknamed Matsumoto which is sent to the past to prevent the war.
Keita Hayashi

 NiaLand android technician at the start of the series.

 Diva's first fan, calling her Vivy after a fairy tale character. Her death in a plane crash affected Vivy greatly and helped inspire her goal to change the world.

 A politician which tried to gain the favour of the populous votes by attempting to implement the AI Naming Law which grants AI some level of human rights. He did not care for the law but if killed, his supporters would push to pass the law so his efforts wouldn't be in vain.

 Works for the Anti-AI organisation, Toak due to his past with his piano teacher AI that was destroyed while saving humans in an accident despite the one-mission per AI law. He is saved by Vivy several times throughout the series and eventually becomes bio-integrated with android parts to prolong his health and forms an agreement with Antonio. Upon his death 40 years after Matsumoto meets Vivy, he installs malware on Diva which deletes Diva's persona, removing Vivy's ability to sing.

 The leader of Kakitani's squad in Toak during the raid to assassinate Aikawa.

 Momoka's sister that met Diva on the Sunrise space hotel.

 A former Toak member, the first human married to an AI, Grace. During the singularity event prevention timeline, Grace was rewritten as the master of the Metal Float island so Saeki assisted Vivy to free her from it by destroying the Metal Island.

Granddaughter of Yūgo Kakitani who relies on a wheelchair for mobility.

Production and release
Vivy: Fluorite Eye's Song is an anime television series created and written by Tappei Nagatsuki and Eiji Umehara, produced by Aniplex, and animated by Wit Studio. The series is directed by Shinpei Ezaki, with Yūsuke Kubo serving as assistant director, the characters were designed by loundraw with Yūichi Takahashi adapting them for animation, and Satoru Kōsaki is composing the music. The opening theme song, "Sing My Pleasure", is performed by Kairi Yagi who performs as the title character, Vivy, and the ending theme song is the piano version of "Fluorite Eye's Song" composed by Kōsaki. The series aired from April 3 to June 19, 2021 on Tokyo MX and other channels, with the first two episodes having a back-to-back premiere. Aniplex of America licensed the series outside of Asia and streamed it on Funimation. Plus Media Networks Asia has licensed the series in Southeast Asia and released it on Aniplus Asia.

Episode list

See also
 Technological singularity

Explanatory notes

References

External links
 Official website 
 Official anime website 
 

2021 anime television series debuts
2021 Japanese novels
Anime with original screenplays
Aniplex
Drama anime and manga
Fiction set in 2061
Fiction set in the 2160s
Japanese webcomics
Mag Garden manga
Science fiction anime and manga
Seven Seas Entertainment titles
Shōnen manga
Tokyo MX original programming
Wit Studio